The Sannyasi rebellion or monk rebellion 1770-77 (The monks' rebellion) was a revolt by the sannyasis and sadhus (Hindu ascetics, respectively) in Bengal, India in the late 18th century which took place around Murshidabad and Baikunthapur forests of Jalpaiguri under the leadership of Pandit Bhabani Charan Pathak. While some refer to it as an early war for India's independence from foreign rule, since the right to collect tax had been given to the British East India Company after the Battle of Buxar in 1764, other historians categorize it as acts of violent banditry following the depopulation of the province in the Bengal famine of 1770.

Early events

At least three separate events are called the Sannyasi Rebellion.  One refers to a large body of Hindu sannyasis who travelled from North India to different parts of Bengal to visit shrines.  En route to the shrines, it was customary for many of these ascetics to exact a religious tax from the headmen and zamindars or regional landlords. In times of prosperity, the headmen and zamindars generally obliged.  However, since the East India Company had received the diwani or right to collect tax, many of the tax demands increased and the local landlords and headmen were unable to pay both the ascetics and the English. Crop failures, and famine, which killed ten million people or an estimated one-third of the population of Bengal compounded the problems since much of the arable land lay fallow.

In the Eighteenth Century Pandit Bhavanicharan Pathak was the main hero of the 'Sannyasi Rebellion' against the British rule and exploitation in the land of Bengal. Sannyasi Rebellion was India's first anti-British independence struggle.

In 1771, 150 saints were put to death, apparently for no reason. This was one of the reasons that caused distress leading to violence, especially in Natore in Rangpur, now in modern Bangladesh. However, some modern historians argue that the movement never gained popular support.

The other two movements involved a sect of Hindu ascetics, the Dasnami naga sannyasis who likewise visited Bengal on pilgrimage mixed with moneylending opportunities. To the British, these ascetics were looters and must be stopped from collecting money that belonged to the company and possibly from even entering the province. It was felt that a large body of people on the move was a possible threat.

Clashes between the Company and ascetics
From hundreds of years monks had been visiting North India and pilgrim sites. They also used to take some alms from zamidars. But after British imposed taxes on zamidars, it became hard for them to give alms to the ascetics. Sannyasis & Fakirs were burden with restrictions as the British government thought they were looters & thugs. And thus rebellion began. Most of the clashes were recorded in the years following the famine but they continued, albeit with a lesser frequency, up until 1802. The reason that even with superior training and forces, the company was not able to suppress sporadic clashes with migrating ascetics was that the control of the company's forces in the far-removed hilly and jungle covered districts like Birbhum and Midnapore on local events was weak.

Legacy
The Sannyasi rebellion was the first of a series of revolts and rebellions in the western districts of the province including (but not restricted to) the Chuar Revolt of 1799 and the Santhal Revolt of 1855–56. What effect the Sannyasi Rebellion had on rebellions that followed is debatable. Perhaps, the best reminder of the Rebellion is in literature, in the Bengali novels Anandamath (1882) and Devi Chaudhurani (1884), written by India's first modern novelist Bankim Chandra Chatterjee. The song, Vande Mataram, which was written in 1876, was used in the novel Anandamath in 1882 (pronounced Anondomôţh in Bengali) and the 1952 movie based on the book. The first two verses of Vande Mataram were later declared to be India's National Song (not to be confused with the Indian National Anthem).

In 2022, Telugu film producer and scriptwriter V. Vijayendra Prasad announced his upcoming project tentatively titled 1770: Ek Sangram, based on Anandamath and the Sannnyasi rebellion. The movie will be simultaneously made in Bengali, Hindi, Tamil and Telugu.

References

Revolutionary movement for Indian independence
Bengal Presidency
Murshidabad district
18th century in British India
Rebellions in India
Wars involving India
Wars involving the United Kingdom
18th-century conflicts
18th century in India
Rebellions against the British Empire
18th-century rebellions